Barbara Lenk (born 4 October 1982) is a German politician for the AfD and, since 2021 member of the Bundestag, the federal diet.

Life and politics 
Lenk was born in 1982 in the East German city of Dresden and was elected directly to the Bundestag in 2021.

References 

Living people
1982 births
Alternative for Germany politicians
Members of the Bundestag 2021–2025
21st-century German politicians
21st-century German women politicians
Female members of the Bundestag